Public affairs may refer to:

 Public affairs (broadcasting), radio or television programs that focus on matters of politics and public policy
 A broad field encompassing public administration, political involvement, lobbying, corporate community involvement, advocacy, and public relations as supported by the Public Affairs Council
 Public affairs (military), offices of the US Department of Defense that deal with the media
 Public Affairs (political party), former Czech political party
 Public relations as a profession
 Public Affairs Press, a 20th-century publishing house based in Washington, DC
 Public Affairs Quarterly, American philosophy journal
 PublicAffairs, a US publishing company

See also
 Public Affairs Council (disambiguation)
A Public Affair, a 2006 album by Jessica Simpson
"A Public Affair" (song), from Simpson's album